The Teatro Lido is a Colombian theater placed at the southeastern coast of Park of Bolívar, in Medellín. The theater began operating in 1945 and in 2007, after a methodical restoration was reopened, and is administered by the Mayor of Medellin. It has capacity for 1,100 spectators and offers a variety of programming throughout the year.

The site was previously occupied by la Macarena billiard hall.

References

Theatres in Medellín
1945 establishments in Colombia
Theatres completed in 1945